The Macau Special Administrative Region ([abbreviated as: RAEM]), commonly known as Macau or Macao (or informally as 馬交 Mǎjiāo) is one of the two special administrative regions (SARs) of the China (PRC), along with Hong Kong.

Portuguese name

Legend

The name Macau is thought to be derived from the Templo de A-Má (Temple of A-Ma or Ma Kok Temple) (媽閣廟, Cantonese Jyutping: Maa1 Gok3 Miu6, local pronunciation: Maa5 Gok3 Miu6 or Maa5 Gok3 Miu2), a still-existing landmark built in 1448 dedicated to the goddess Matsu - the goddess of seafarers and fishermen.

In keeping with saga, a fishing boat sailing across the sea one day found itself in an unexpected storm. Everyone on board was about to give up all hope of surviving this natural disaster when an attractive young lady, who had boarded the boat at the eleventh hour, stood up and ordered the tempest to calm down. The gale ceased and the sea became calm. The fishing boat, without further event, arrived safely at the port of Hoi Keang.  The young lady walked ashore to the top of the Barra Hill where, in a glowing
aura of light and fragrance; she immediately ascended into heaven. A temple was built on the specific location where she set foot.

Several hundred years later (circa 1513), when Portuguese sailors landed and asked the name of the place, the locals replied "媽閣". The Portuguese then named the peninsula "Macao". A number of other legends exist, including a derivation from 馬交, which is more likely derived from the Portuguese name.

Textual evidence 
Textual evidence points to the name "Macau" being derived from a local name , written as such in both Chinese and Japanese texts since the sixteenth century. The name was transcribed variously as "Amaquão" among other spellings, which is equivalent to "Amacão" in sound. The corrupted "Macão" appeared in 1641, before finally losing the nasal tilde into the near-modern form of "Macao" in a 1652 Jesuit publication. The evolution to "Macau" is generally attributed to the 1911 Reforms of Portuguese orthography.

Contemporary Spanish text used a name "Macan", pronounced similarly to "Macão". Batalha suggests that the loss of nasalization may have to do with association with the word cão (dog, devil).

Chinese names

The Chinese name Aomen 澳門 (pinyin: Àomén, Cantonese: Ou3 Mun4*2 ) means "Inlet Gates". The "gates" refer to two erect gate-like mountains of Nantai and Beitai. Alternately, Ao may derive from Macau's previous name Heong San Ou, as it is geographically situated at "Cross' Door".

Macau is also known as:
 Hou Keng Ou (壕鏡澳 Oyster-mirror Inlet)
 Heong San Ou (香山澳 Xiangshan Ao; Fragrant-mountain Inlet)
 Lin Tou (蓮島 Liandao; Lotus Island)
 Soda Port (梳打埠)

While Ou3 Mun2 is the traditional Cantonese name of the place, it is common among the Cantonese-speaking to use the Portuguese-derived name 馬交 Maa5 Gaau1 .

Duality in English
Two spellings of the name exist in English: "Macao", derived from the original Portuguese spelling; and "Macau", derived from the current orthography. Since the transfer of sovereignty over Macau in 1999, the government of Macau considers both "Macau" and "Macao" to be acceptable spellings of the name in English language publications, but the former was more widely used across English-speaking world, especially in the United States and Australia. While the latter was more widely used in the United Kingdom, especially in government documents. Meanwhile, the spelling was mixed in Canada.

Dualism is visible in many English language government publications and documents, sometimes even within the same paragraph. For example, the spelling "Macao" appears on the local government's English language emblem as seen at its web portal and also at the official website of the Macao Government Tourism Office. Similarly, "Macao" is used on the Macau Special Administrative Region passport, but the government's official explanatory note on the passport spells it as "Macau".  most English-language books use "Macau".

Official and diplomatic status

There are two official versions of the Basic Law of Macau, one in Chinese and one in Portuguese. According to articles 136 and 137 of the Basic Law the place may represent itself as "中國澳門" or "Macau, China". The two names are specified in the versions of their respective languages only and not vice versa. The "unofficial" English translations from Government Printing Bureau and University of Macau adopt the "Macao" spelling throughout.

After the 1999 resumption of sovereignty the central government of China announced that Macao would be the spelling in English. The Macau authorities issued an internal circular on the matter since when government publications in English use the spelling Macao. Less commonly used is the pinyin transcription of 澳門 Aòmén, but its usage is not used officially. The decision not to adopt pinyin names after the handover to China appears to be consistent with the usual PRC policy of respecting the local linguistic traditions in the romanized version of names, as in other non-pinyin names like Lhasa, Ürümqi or Hohhot, for example. The preference for "Macao" may be explained by a similarity to 馬交 Mǎjiāo, in particular the pinyin pronunciation of "ao" is approximately as in cow; the a is much more audible than the o.

Notwithstanding the official Basic Law of Macau requirement to use "Macau, China", Macau participates in international organisations and international sport events like World Trade Organization and International Monetary Fund meetings and East Asian Games as "Macao, China".

"Macao" is also the designated name of the ISO 3166-1 country code MO, and of the top-level domain .mo.

Historical names
In 1587, king Philip I of Portugal (II of Spain) promoted Macau from "Settlement or Port of the Name of God" to "City of the Name of God".

Alternative names for Macau

References

Further reading

Macau
History of Macau
Macau
Macau